Carrin F. Patman is an American attorney who has served as United States ambassador to Iceland since October 2022. She formerly served as the chair of Houston Metro from 2016 to 2022.

Education 
Patman earned a Bachelor of Arts from Duke University and a Juris Doctor from the University of Texas School of Law in 1982.

Career 
Patman has a distinguished record of civic engagement, which includes service as a member of the Houston Chapter of the International Women’s Forum, and on the boards of the Greater Houston Partnership and the Houston-Galveston Area Transportation Policy Council. Patman was also a Founding Board Member of The Center for Women in Law, as well as an Executive Committee Member of Girls, Inc. of Greater Houston and Sheltering Arms Senior Services.

Patman is a partner at Bracewell LLP, where she specializes in class action litigation, commercial disputes, antitrust and competition issues, environmental violations, and regulatory compliance. She was a member of the board of Houston Metro from 2010 to 2022 and was appointed chair by Sylvester Turner in 2016. Patman was a major fundraiser to the Hillary Clinton 2016 presidential campaign and Joe Biden 2020 presidential campaign.

Ambassador to Iceland
On February 11, 2022, President Joe Biden nominated Patman to be the next United States ambassador to Iceland. Hearings on her nomination were held before the Senate Foreign Relations Committee on July 28, 2022. Her nomination was favorably reported on August 4, 2022. Patman was confirmed by the full Senate on August 7, 2022 by voice vote. She presented her credentials to President Guðni Th. Jóhannesson on October 6, 2022.

Awards and recognitions
Patman has received multiple awards and was the first woman to receive the Karen H. Susman Jurisprudence Award, given by the Anti‐Defamation League Southwest Region.

Personal life 
Patman's father, Bill Patman, served as a member of the Texas Senate and United States House of Representatives.
She is married to James V. Derrick Jr, former Executive Vice President and General Counsel to Enron Corporation.

References 

Living people
20th-century American women lawyers
20th-century American lawyers
21st-century American diplomats
21st-century American women lawyers
21st-century American lawyers
Ambassadors of the United States to Iceland
American women diplomats
Duke University alumni
Texas lawyers
University of Texas School of Law alumni
Year of birth missing (living people)